The 10th Airborne Command and Control Squadron in an inactive United States Air Force unit that flew airborne command post aircraft from RAF Mildenhall, England from January 1970 to December 1991.  Through a unit consolidation in September 1985, the squadron has roots in units that participated in World War II, the Korean War and the Vietnam War

The first predecessor of the squadron was the 10th Transport Squadron, which flew distinguished visitors to all areas of the globe where the Allies of World War II operated.  It was disbanded in the spring of 1944 in a reorganization of Army Air Forces units.

The 10th's second predecessor was the 10th Liaison Squadron, which provided light airlift support to Fifth Air Force units during the Korean War, this squadron was inactivated in 1955.

The final predecessor was the 10th Fighter Squadron, Commando, which performed combat testing of the Northrop F-5 Freedom Fighter from April 1966 until the planes were transferred to the Viet Nam Air Force in April 1967.  These three units were consolidated into a single unit in September 1985.

History

World War II

The first predecessor of the squadron was activated on 1 March 1942 as the 10th Air Corps Ferrying Squadron at Bolling Field and equipped with a variety of transport aircraft.  The squadron was the flying component of the newly-formed Bolling Field Sector, Air Corps Ferrying Command and was part of the command's Foreign Wing. The squadron not only ferried aircraft overseas, it transported equipment and high-ranking officials on trans-Atlantic flights.  It flew missions to support Operation Torch, the invasion of North Africa in late 1942 and early 1943.

In March 1943, the squadron became the 10th Transport Squadron and moved to General Billy Mitchell Field, Wisconsin.  It flew high ranking personnel to locations in the Americas, the Far East and the Southwest Pacific, notably, in October a squadron Douglas C-54 Skymaster transported ambassador Averell Harriman from Washington, DC to Moscow.  The squadron became non-operational at the beginning of 1944, when most its personnel were transferred to the headquarters of the 26th Transport Group. Although the squadron nominally remained behind at General Mitchell Field, the group moved to Gravelly Point, Virginia, where it continued transporting distinguished visitors.

However, the Army Air Forces was finding that standard military units, based on relatively inflexible tables of organization not well adapted to support missions.  Accordingly, it adopted a more functional system in which each base was organized into a separate numbered unit. Air Transport Command personnel at General Mitchell Field when the squadron disbanded there were merged into the 567th AAF Base Unit (14th Ferrying Service Station), while those at Gravelly Point became the 503d AAF Base Unit (26th Transport Group, Washington National Airport).

Korean War

The second predecessor of the squadron, the 10th Liaison Squadron was activated at Seoul Air Base in July 1951 and assigned to Fifth Air Force.  Far East Air Forces had requested the organization of a unit that included Sikorsky H-19 helicopters to enable it to perform aeromedical evacuation missions, but the squadron was authorized only fixed wing aircraft, limiting its mission to serving as a light transport and communications unit in Korea until inactivating in 1955.  It was equipped with Stinson L-5 Sentinel and de Havilland Canada L-20 Beaver aircraft.  It provided light airlift to forward units and provided courier service.  It surveyed forward areas for potential sites for landing strips, and communications and radar sites.  It performed regular reconnaissance of abandoned airstrips.  On occasion it transported North Korean prisoners of war and airdropped arms and supplies to guerillas operating behind enemy lines.  Following the armistice in Korea, it was inactivated in March 1955.

Skoshi Tiger

The 10th Fighter Squadron, Commando was activated at Bien Hoa Air Base, South Vietnam in April 1967 to test the Northrop F-5 Freedom Fighter in operational missions.  Tactical Air Command had organized the Tactical Fighter Squadron, Provisional, 4503d at Williams Air Force Base, Arizona to begin testing the F-5 under the name "Skoshi Tiger" on 22 July 1965, with pilots and maintenance personnel from the USAF Tactical Air Warfare Center.  After conducting initial tests in the United States, the 4503d deployed a dozen of its fighters to Bien Hoa in October 1965, although the squadron officially remained at Williams until 10 March 1966. On 8 April, the provisional squadron was discontinued and its personnel and equipment were used to form the regular 10th Squadron.

The squadron increased in size to 18 aircraft.  It flew more than 7,000 operational missions, earning a Presidential Unit Citation and a Vietnamese Gallantry Cross with Palm. Six squadron aircraft were lost to enemy fire. In October 1966, the squadron began to train Viet Nam Air Force (VNAF) personnel on the operation and maintenance of the F-5.  After a year of testing, its aircraft were turned over to the 522nd Fighter Squadron of the VNAF 23rd Tactical Wing at Bien Hoa on 17 April 1967 and the unit was inactivated, although some squadron personnel remained behind to continue training.

Airborne Command and Control
The 10th Airborne Command Control Squadron was activated at RAF Mildenhall in January 1970, where it replaced the 7120th Airborne Command Control Squadron to provide an airborne command post for United States Air Forces Europe.  The 7120th had performed this mission (Operation Silk Purse) since 1 December 1961, when it was activated at Chateauroux Air Base, France under the 322d Air Division.  Seven months later, the squadron was assigned to the host organization at Chateauroux, the 7322d Air Base Group.  The 7120th was redesignated as an airborne command control squadron on 1 October 1965, and moved to Mildenhall the following month, where it became part of the 513th Troop Carrier Wing on 1 July 1966.

The squadron's crews flew the Boeing EC-135H Airborne Command Post to support the United States Commander-in-Chief, Europe. The battle staff in the planes were from another organization. Squadron EC-135s also served as aerial tankers after 1972.  The aircraft provided communications support during exercises in support of NATO, and other agencies following overwater routes near Europe.  The planes also stood alert for emergency launches at Mildenhall. In 1970 and 1980, they operated from RAF Lakenheath while repairs were made on the runway at Mildenhall. With the end of the Cold War, the squadron was inactivated at the end of 1991.

Lineage
 10th Transport Squadron
 Constituted as the 10th Air Corps Ferry Squadron on 18 February 1942
 Activated on 1 March 1942
 Redesignated 10th Transport Squadron on 9 March 1943
 Disbanded on 31 March 1944
 Reconstituted and consolidated with the 10th Liaison Squadron, 10th Fighter Squadron, Commando and 10th Airborne Command Control Squadron as the 10th Airborne Command Control Squadron on 19 September 1985
 10th Liaison Squadron
 Constituted as the 10th Liaison Squadron on 1 June 1951
 Activated on 25 July 1951
 Inactivated on 15 March 1955
 Consolidated with the 10th Transport Squadron, 10th Fighter Squadron, Commando and 10th Airborne Command Control Squadron as the 10th Airborne Command Control Squadron on 19 September 1985
 10th Fighter Squadron, Commando
 Constituted on 28 March 1966 as the 10th Fighter Squadron, Commando and activated (not organized)
 Organized on 8 April 1966
 Inactivated on 17 April 1967
 Consolidated with the 10th Transport Squadron, 10th Liaison Squadron and 10th Airborne Command Control Squadron as the 10th Airborne Command Control Squadron on 19 September 1985
 10th Airborne Command and Control Squadron
 Constituted as the 10th Airborne Command Control Squadron on 15 September 1969
 Activated on 1 January 1970
 Consolidated with the 10th Transport Squadron, 10th Liaison Squadron and 10th Fighter Squadron, Commando on 19 September 1985
 Redesignated 10th Airborne Command and Control Squadron on 18 June 1987
 Inactivated on 31 December 1991

Assignments
 Bolling Field Sector, Air Corps Ferrying Command (later Transatlantic Sector, Air Corps Ferrying Command; Transatlantic Sector, Air Transport Command), 1 March 1942
 Domestic Transportation Division, Air Transport Command, 1 March 1943
 26th Transport Group, 1 April 1943 – 31 March 1944
 Fifth Air Force, 25 July 1951 – 15 March 1955
 Pacific Air Forces, 28 March 1966 (not organized)
 3d Tactical Fighter Wing, 8 April 1966 – 17 April 1967
 513th Tactical Airlift Wing (later 513th Airborne Command and Control Wing), 1 January 1970 – 31 December 1991

Stations
 Bolling Field, District of Columbia, 1 March 1942
 General Billy Mitchell Field, Wisconsin, 1 March 1943 – 31 March 1944
 Seoul Airdrome (later Seoul Air Base), South Korea, 25 July 1951
 Osan Air Base, South Korea, 28 January 1954 – 15 March 1955
 Bien Hoa Air Base, South Vietnam, 8 April 1966 – 17 April 1967
 RAF Mildenhall, England, 1 January 1970 – 31 December 1991

Aircraft

 Douglas C-47 Skytrain, 1942-1944
 Consolidated B-24 Liberator, 1942
 Consolidated C-87 Liberator Express, c. 1942-1944
 Curtiss C-46 Commando, c.1943-1944
 Douglas C-54 Skymaster, c.1943-1944
 Lockheed C-56 Lodestar, c. 1942-1944
 Lockheed C-60 Lodestar, c. 1942-1944
 Noorduyn C-64 Norseman, c. 1942-1944
 Douglas UC-67 Dragon, c. 1942-1944
 Douglas C-84, c. 1942-1944
 Stinson L-5 Sentinel, 1951, 1953
 de Havilland Canada L-20 Beaver, 1952-1955
 Northrop F-5 Freedom Fighter, 1966-1967
 Boeing EC-135H, 1970-1991

Awards and campaigns

See also

 List of United States Air Force airborne command and control squadrons
 List of United States Air Force fighter squadrons
 List of Douglas C-47 Skytrain operators

References

Notes
 Explanatory notes

 Citations

Bibliography

 
 
 
 
 
 
 
  (link is to Google Books extract)

External links
 
 

Air control squadrons of the United States Air Force
Command and control squadrons of the United States Air Force
American Theater of World War II